is a retired Japanese Olympic, Asian and National Record holding swimmer. He swam for Japan at the 2004, 2008 Olympics, 2012 Olympics, and 2016 Olympics, winning four medals. At the 2008 Olympics, he won a bronze medal in the men's 200 m butterfly in an Asian Record of 1:52.97; in doing so, he also set the Japanese Record in the event. On November 12, 2011, Matsuda set a new Japanese record (1:49.50) at the FINA World Cup for the short course 200 m butterfly. In doing so, he became just the third swimmer in history to break the 1:50 barrier for the event.

Career

Early Years
Matsuda was born in the rural town of Nobeoka, Miyazaki, where he began swimming at the age of 4 at a local pool. Since then, he has trained with the same coach, Yumiko Kuze, a rare female coach in the world of men's swimming. She was a swimmer in her youth and began as a volunteer coach at the local pool (personal interview).

2004 Olympics
At the 2004 Olympic Games, Matsuda placed 8th in the 400 m freestyle final.

2008 Olympics
In the final of the men's 200m butterfly at the 2008 Olympics, he finished 3rd to claim bronze. He came behind Michael Phelps and László Cseh, with a time of 1:52.97, an Asian record.

2012 Olympics
At the 2012 Olympics, Matsuda won two medals. He defended his bronze medal in the 200 meter butterfly and swam the butterfly leg for Japan's silver medal-winning relay team in the 4 × 100 meter medley relay with Ryosuke Irie, Kosuke Kitajima, and Takuro Fujii. He also swam the 100 meter butterfly, where he tied for sixteenth in the heats and subsequently lost a swim-off with Benjamin Starke of Germany, shutting him out of the semifinals.

2016 Olympics
At his final Olympics, Matsuda won a bronze medal in the 4 × 200 metre freestyle relay.

Personal bests
In long course
 400m freestyle: 3:44.99 Former Japanese Record (August 9, 2008)
 800m freestyle: 7:49.65 Japanese Record (April 19, 2009)
 200m butterfly: 1:52.97 Asian Record (August 13, 2008)

In short course
 200m butterfly: 1:49.50 Former Japanese Record (November 12, 2011)

See also
 List of Japanese records in swimming
 List of Asian records in swimming

References

External links
 
 
 Takeshi Kojima, Greenhouse to Water Cube / Matsuda's unorthodox training bears fruit in Beijing, / Yomiuri Shimbun, 14 August 2008

1984 births
Living people
Olympic swimmers of Japan
Swimmers at the 2004 Summer Olympics
Swimmers at the 2008 Summer Olympics
Swimmers at the 2012 Summer Olympics
Olympic silver medalists for Japan
Olympic bronze medalists for Japan
People from Miyazaki Prefecture
Olympic bronze medalists in swimming
World Aquatics Championships medalists in swimming
Asian Games medalists in swimming
Swimmers at the 2002 Asian Games
Swimmers at the 2006 Asian Games
Swimmers at the 2010 Asian Games
Swimmers at the 2014 Asian Games
Medalists at the 2012 Summer Olympics
Medalists at the 2008 Summer Olympics
Asian Games gold medalists for Japan
Asian Games silver medalists for Japan
Asian Games bronze medalists for Japan
Japanese male butterfly swimmers
Japanese male freestyle swimmers
Medalists at the 2016 Summer Olympics
Swimmers at the 2016 Summer Olympics
Olympic silver medalists in swimming
Medalists at the 2002 Asian Games
Medalists at the 2006 Asian Games
Medalists at the 2010 Asian Games
Medalists at the 2014 Asian Games
Universiade medalists in swimming
Universiade gold medalists for Japan
Medalists at the 2003 Summer Universiade
Medalists at the 2005 Summer Universiade
20th-century Japanese people
21st-century Japanese people